Wingly, a company which runs a flightsharing website.
 The Legend of Dragoon, with characters called Winglies.